Massie Creek is a stream in eastern Montgomery and southwestern Warren counties in the U.S. state of Missouri.  It is a tributary of Loutre Slough.

The stream flow south to southwest into Warren County to its confluence with the Loutre Slough at  within the Missouri River valley just east of the community of Case and after crossing under Missouri Route 94.

Variant names include "Massas Creek", "Masses Creek", "Masseys Creek", and "Massies Creek". The creek most likely has the name of Peter Massie, an early settler.

See also
List of rivers of Missouri

References

Rivers of Montgomery County, Missouri
Rivers of Warren County, Missouri
Rivers of Missouri